Cockroach Key (also known as the Indian Hill, Indian Key, and Cockroach Key) is a historic site near Ruskin, Florida, United States. It is located south of the Little Manatee River, roughly three miles west of Sun City. On December 4, 1973, it was added to the U.S. National Register of Historic Places.

References

External links

 Hillsborough County listings at National Register of Historic Places
 Hillsborough County listings at Florida's Office of Cultural and Historical Programs

National Register of Historic Places in Hillsborough County, Florida